Brett Kelly born in Australia is a former rugby league footballer who last played for SO Avignon in the Elite One Championship. Kelly previously played with the Canberra Raiders and Cronulla Sharks in the NRL.

However, the majority of his NRL matches were on the wing.

Kelly scored 22 tries and a total of 190 points for  Souths Logan Magpies in the Queensland Cup from 2008-2010. He represented the Queensland Residents against NSW Residents in 2009 at Suncorp Stadium.

References

External links
Canberra Raiders profile
RLeague.com profile

1983 births
Living people
Australian expatriate rugby league players
Australian expatriate sportspeople in France
Australian rugby league players
Canberra Raiders players
Cronulla-Sutherland Sharks players
Expatriate rugby league players in France
Rugby league centres
Rugby league players from New South Wales
Rugby league wingers
Souths Logan Magpies players
Sporting Olympique Avignon players